Drones & Vapid Ditties is a music DVD by Australian indie rock band Augie March. It was released on 6 September 2004 by BMG Australia. The initials of the words "Drones & Vapid Ditties" spell out the letters "DVD".  Described on the back of the case as a "shambles", the DVD contains numerous live performances (including a full set from the 2003 Meredith Music Festival), as well as a collection of all the band's music videos to that date.

References

2004 video albums
Augie March video albums
Music video compilation albums
Live video albums
2004 live albums
2004 compilation albums
2000s English-language films